Rajya Sabha elections were held on various dates in 1989, to elect members of the Rajya Sabha, Indian Parliament's upper chamber.

Elections
Elections were held to elect members from various states.

Members elected
The following members are elected in the elections held in 1989. They are members for the term 1989-1995 and retire in year 1995, except in case of the resignation or death before the term.
The list is incomplete.

State - Member - Party

Bye-elections
The following bye elections were held in the year 1989.

State - Member - Party

 Madhya Pradesh -  Azam Ghufran  - INC  ( ele  16/06/1989 term till 1994 )
 Tamil Nadu - Viduthalai Virumbi   - DMK   ( ele  15/03/1989 term till 1989 )
 Tamil Nadu - P T Kiruttinan   - DMK  ( ele  15/03/1989 term till 1990 )
 West Bengal - Ratna Bahadur Rai   - CPM  ( ele  23/03/1989 term till 1990 )
 Nagaland - Khyomo Lotha   - INC  ( ele  08/06/1989 term till 1992 )
 Uttar Pradesh -  Ram Naresh Yadav - INC  ( ele  20/06/1989 term till 1994 )
 Uttar Pradesh -  Mohan Singh - INC  ( ele  01/08/1989 term till 1990 )
 Andhra Pradesh -  Mentay Padmanabham - TDP  ( ele  13/09/1989 term till 1994 )
 Bihar - Shamim Hashmi  - INC  ( ele  25/09/1989 term till 1994 )
 Jammu and Kashmir - Shabir Ahmed Salaria - JKNC  ( ele 25/09/1989 term till 1992 )
 Uttar Pradesh -  Alia Kumari - INC  ( ele  11/10/1989 term till 1992 )

References

1989 elections in India
1989